Corticeus (Stenophloeus) cephalotes is a species of darkling beetle distributed all over Oriental region and Vanuatu.

Description
The species can be identified separately from other related species from the distinct, longitudinal elevations on clypeus, which terminate anterior in a sharp corner or point. The body length is about 3.14 to 4.46 mm.

References 

Tenebrionidae
Insects of Sri Lanka
Insects of India
Insects described in 1913